Bon Voyage is the firsdebut studio album and by the Swiss singer-songwriter Anna Rossinelli, released on 9 December 2011, by Universal Music. The album includes the single "Joker". The album was produced by Fred Herrmann and entered the Swiss Albums Chart at number 10. The song "No One" was available for free on iTunes before the release of the album.

Singles
 "Joker" was released as the album's first single on 14 October 2011. The song was written by Phillipa Alexander, Ellie Wyatt, Alex Ball and Vicky Nolan and produced by Fred Herrmann.
 "See What You've Done" was released as the album's second single. The video was released on 12 April 2012.

Track listing

Chart performance

Release history

References

External links
 Anna Rossinelli's official website
 Anna Rossinelli on Twitter
 Anna Rossinelli on Twitter

2011 debut albums
Anna Rossinelli albums
Universal Music Germany albums